The Relics of Jegg-Sau is a Big Finish Productions audio drama featuring Lisa Bowerman as Bernice Summerfield, a character from the spin-off media based on the long-running British science fiction television series Doctor Who.

Plot 
Bernice visits the failed colony of Jegg-Sau in search of long-lost treasure. But the planet isn't as lifeless as everyone believes...

Cast
Bernice Summerfield — Lisa Bowerman
Robot — Michael Kilgarriff
Kalwell — Paul Shelley
Elise Kalwell — Katherine Holme

Inspiration
The title and plot of this story was inspired by a 1970s Doctor Who licensed jigsaw puzzle that depicted a scene with giant robots identical to the one that appeared in the television story Robot.

References

External links
Big Finish Productions - Professor Bernice Summerfield: The Relics of Jegg-Sau

Bernice Summerfield audio plays
Plays by Stephen Cole
2004 audio plays
Fiction set in the 27th century